Ptericoptus borealis is a species of beetle in the family Cerambycidae. It was described by Breuning in 1939. It is known from Mexico.

References

Ptericoptus
Beetles described in 1939